

This is a list of the National Register of Historic Places listings in Adams County, Mississippi.

This is intended to be a complete list of the properties and districts on the National Register of Historic Places in Adams County, Mississippi, United States. Latitude and longitude coordinates are provided for many National Register properties and districts; these locations may be seen together in a map.

There are 121 properties and districts listed on the National Register in the county, including 13 National Historic Landmarks.  Another 2 properties were once listed but have been removed.

Current listings

|}

Former listings

|}

See also

 List of National Historic Landmarks in Mississippi
 National Register of Historic Places listings in Mississippi

References

 
Adams